Altaf Hussain Hali ( – ; 1837 – 31 December 1914), also known as Maulana Khawaja Hali, was an Urdu poet and writer.

Early life
He was born in Panipat to Aizad Baksh and was a descendant of Abu Ayyub al-Ansari. He was in the care of his elder brother Imdad Husain after the death of his parents and when he was seventeen he married his cousin Islam-un-Nisa. Hali studied the Quran under Hafiz Mumtaz Husain, Arabic under Haji Ibrahim Husain and Persian under Syed Jafar Ali. Aged seventeen he travelled to Delhi to study at the madrasa opposite Jama Masjid, which was called Husain Baksh ka Madrasa.

Hali composed an essay in Arabic that supported the dialectics of Siddiq Hasan Khan, who was an adherent of Wahhabism. His teacher, Maulvi Navazish Ali, belonged to the Hanafi school and when he saw the essay he tore it up. At this time Hali adopted the takhallus "Khasta", which means "the exhausted, the distressed, the heartbroken". He showed his work to the poet Ghalib, who advised him: "Young man, I never advise anyone to write poetry but to you I say, if you don't write poetry, you will be very harsh on your temperament".

In 1855 he returned to Panipat and his first son was born. In the following year he was employed at the Collector's office in Hissar.

Writing
The Indian rebellion of 1857 was an armed uprising in British India against the oppressive and destructive British colonial rule and was also popularly remembered as the 'First War of Independence'. This was a turning point in his life because he was an eyewitness to the catastrophe. His family took in a widowed girl who lived with them for the rest of her life. Her plight left a deep impression on Hali and he composed two poems on the condition of women: Munajaat-e-Beva (Supplication of the Widow) and Chup ki Daad (Homage to the Silent). Syeda Saiyidain Hameed called Hali "Urdu's first feminist poet".

In 1863 he was appointed tutor to the children of Nawab Mustafa Khan Shefta of Jahangirabad, a position he held for eight years. In Lahore he was employed at the Government Book Depot from 1871 to 1874, where his task was to correct Urdu translations of English books. This brought him into contact with a wide range of literature and led to him writing the first book of literary criticism in Urdu, Muqaddama-e-Shair-o-Shairi. This was published as an introduction to his collected poems, Divan (1890) and then on its own (1893). Annemarie Schimmel called Hali the "founder of literary tradition in Urdu". He had by this time changed his takhallus from "Khasta" to "Hali", which means "contemporary" or "modern".

While in Lahore Hali saw a new form of Mushaira, where instead of reciting poetry at will, poets were given a subject to write about. This was begun by Muhammad Husain Azad and the Director of Public Education, W. R. M. Holroyd. Hali composed four poems for this purpose: Nishat-e-Umeed (Delight of Hope), Manazra-a-Rahm-o-Insaaf (Dialogue between Mercy and Justice), Barkha Rut (Rainy Season) and Hubb-e-Watan (Patriotism).

From 1874 until 1877 Hali taught at the Anglo Arabic School in Delhi, where he came into contact with Syed Ahmad Khan. He advised Hali to "write something like Marsiya-e-Andalus (dirge for Spain)" on the condition of the Muslims of India. Later Urdu writers called this moment: "This is the place where the Quom got a poet and the poet got a Quom". Hali therefore began to compose his epic poem, the Musaddas e-Madd o-Jazr e-Islam ("An elegiac poem on the Ebb and Tide of Islam"). Khan acclaimed it upon its publication in 1879 in a letter to Hali:

It will be entirely correct if the modern age of Urdu poetry is dated from the date inscribed in Musaddas. I do not have the power of expression to describe the elegance, beauty and flow of this poem. ... I am undoubtedly its inspiration. I consider this poem among those finest deeds of mine that when God asks me what did you bring with you, I will say “Nothing but that I got Hali to write the Musaddas!”

He also called it the "mirror of the nation's condition and an elegy expressive of its grief". In the Musaddas Hali condemned what he saw as dogmatism, obscurantism and bigotry, and he attributed the decline of India's Muslims to the discouragement of dissent and the placing of religious rituals above the spirit of religion. He concluded the poem by warning Muslims to repair their ship before it is ship-wrecked in a storm. 

The poem was very popular and apart from the first couple of editions, Hali dedicated the poem to the nation and took no royalties. Some scholars of Pakistani nationalism also consider the Mussadas an important text for the articulation of a future Muslim nation, Pakistan, which eventually was created in 1947. During an international seminar on Hali held in Delhi on 29 November 2001, scholars concluded that Hali could not have written the Musaddas without reading at least 5,000 pages of Islamic history.

After Khan's death Hali wrote his biography, Hayat-e-Javed, which was published in 1901. He was awarded the title Shamsul Ulema ("Sun among Scholars") by the government. Hali's Mussadas-e-Hali also contains 'Mehnat ki Barkaat', which is an extract intended to spread awareness in Muslims.

Death and legacy
Altaf Hussain Hali died in 1914. Pakistan Post issued a commemorative postage stamp in his honor on 23 March 1979 in its 'Pioneers of Freedom' series. "His great 'Musaddas' is one of the most inspiring poems in Urdu literature and had a lasting influence on the minds and attitudes of the Muslims in the sub-continent and continues to inspire them to this day." 

According to a major Pakistani English-language newspaper, Altaf Hussain Hali and Maulana Shibli Nomani played key roles in rescuing Urdu language poetry in the 19th century, "Hali and Shibli rescued Urdu poetry. They re-conceived Urdu poetry and took it towards a transformation that was the need of the hour."

In the same above-mentioned newspaper article, Baba-e-Urdu (Father of Urdu) Maulvi Abdul Haq is quoted as saying, "Outstanding poetry happens when there is poetic departure and a poet is able to take universal meaning out of immediate events."

Works

 A biography of Ghalib, Yadgar-e-Ghalib – life and works of Mirza Asadullah Khan Ghalib (1797–1869), a legendary Urdu language poet of the 19th-century
 A biography of Saadi Shirazi, Hayat-e-Saadi – life and works of celebrated Persian language scholar and poet 'Saadi Shirazi' (1210–1292) of the 13th-century 
 A biography of Sir Syed Ahmed Khan, Hayat-e-Javed – life and works of a renowned educationist, scholar and social reformer 'Sir Syed Ahmed Khan' (1817–1898) of the 19th-century
 Hali also wrote a poem "Barkha Rut"
 "Woh Nabiyon Mein Rahmat Laqab Paanaywala", a naat written by Altaf Hussain Hali

References

External links
Hayat-e-Javed Vol 1 & 2 by Hali
Major Works by Hali
Maulana Altaf Hussain Hali – Karwaan-e-Aligarh

1837 births
1914 deaths
Muslim poets
Urdu-language poets
19th-century Indian poets
19th-century Indian Muslims
People from Panipat
Writers from Lahore
Academic staff of Aitchison College
Indian male poets
Epic poets
Poets from Haryana
19th-century Indian male writers